Jonathan Owen Bree is a singer-songwriter and producer from New Zealand, best known for his work as a solo artist, as well as co-founding the indie pop group The Brunettes, in 1998 and Lil' Chief Records, in 2002. He frequently collaborates with label-mates as a musician, engineer, and record producer.

Early life 
Jonathan Bree was born in New Zealand. Mark Lyons, frontman of indie pop band The Nudie Suits, was both Bree's cousin and a mentor in Bree's formative years. When Bree was ten, Lyons introduced him to Modern Lovers, with Bree becoming a long-term fan. At 12 years old, Bree first played live (and recorded) as the drummer in Lyons' band, The Plaster Saints.

Music career
The Brunettes were formed in Auckland in 1998 by Bree and Heather Mansfield. According to Bree, "My cousin had recorded her band Yoko and I thought she had a great natural voice, no silly effected delivery. I was looking for a girl to sing on some duets I had written so I tracked down her number." The band independently released its first recording Mars Loves Venus EP in 1998.

In 2002, Bree founded Lil' Chief Records with fellow indie pop musician Scott Mannion of The Tokey Tones. The two men had met that year in Marbecks Record Store in Auckland, where Bree was working at the time. The Brunettes' album Holding Hands, Feeding Ducks released in 2002 was the debut release for the label.  The album received a glowing review from Allmusic, as did the label's second release, The Brunettes' 2003 The Boyracer EP. Bree produced both albums. The next two albums on the label were released simultaneously in 2003 by The Tokey Tones, and Bree guested on some of the tracks.

Bree went on to release several more albums on Lil' Chief with The Brunettes. Their second album Mars Loves Venus was released in June 2004 followed by 2005's EP When Ice Met Cream. In 2004, Ryan McPhun started playing in band, who opened for The Shins 2005 tour of North America. They have also opened for Rilo Kiley, The Postal Service, Broken Social Scene, Clap Your Hands Say Yeah, and Beirut and played at the 2006 Big Day Out festivals in New Zealand and Australia.

The Brunettes' album Structure & Cosmetics was released in July 2007 in New Zealand and August in the US, on Sub Pop. Their UK profile was lifted after their track "BABY" was featured in a UK campaign in December 2007, and the release of their music video. In 2008, The Brunettes covered The Cure's "Lovesong" for American Laundromat Records tribute compilation Just Like Heaven – a tribute to The Cure.

In 2009, The Brunettes released the Red Rollerskates EP on Lil' Chief, shortly followed by Paper Dolls. In 2010, their song "Red Rollerskates" was included in soundtrack of the 2K Sports video game NBA 2K11. "Brunettes Against Bubblegum Youth" was featured on an extended advertisement for Hollyoaks in the UK.

His first work post-Brunettes was as a co-producer on the Princess Chelsea album, Lil' Golden Book. He also supplied vocals for the song, "The Cigarette Duet" and directed the accompanying music video, which subsequently went viral – reaching nearly 40 million views in the years that followed.

Bree's first work as a solo artist came in 2013 with the release of The Primrose Path. His next album, A Little Night Music, followed in 2015. Yet his big breakthrough came in the lead-up to his third album, when the song "" became a sensation on YouTube – drawing viewers with its odd depiction of a 1960s-style band whose faces were covered in spandex masks. It soon surpassed 1 million views and is currently at 22.7M views as of August 2021.

Discography

Brunettes albums 
1998: Mars Loves Venus EP
2002: Holding Hands, Feeding Ducks
2003: The Boyracer e.p.
2004: Mars Loves Venus
2005: When Ice Met Cream E.P.
2007: Structure & Cosmetics
2009: Paper Dolls
2009: The Red Rollerskates E.P.
2011: Mars Loves Venus (vinyl)

Compilations 
 2009: "Lovesong" by The Cure on Just Like Heaven – a tribute to The Cure
 2016: "Last Night's Love" by The Reduction Agents on Waiting For Your Love – a tribute to The Reduction Agents

Solo releases 
 2013: The Primrose Path
 2015: A Little Night Music
 2018: Sleepwalking
 2020: After the Curtains Close

Collaborations 
 2011: co-producer on Lil Golden Book by Princess Chelsea
 2015: co-producer on Great Cybernetic Depression by Princess Chelsea

Upcoming  
Pre-Code Hollywood, solo album to be released 2023-04-14

See also
Lil' Chief Records
The Brunettes
Princess Chelsea
Zentai Mask

References

External links
Lil' Chief Records
A conversation with Jonathan Bree by Adam McKibbin (February 2010)
Feature: The Brunettes – Coming Clean About Cosmetics by NZ Musician (August 2007)

Living people
New Zealand musicians
Lil' Chief Records artists
1977 births